Wodynie  is a village in Siedlce County, Masovian Voivodeship, in east-central Poland. It is the seat of the gmina (administrative district) called Gmina Wodynie.

The village has a population of 630.

References

Wodynie